Symplocos cerasifolia is a plant in the family Symplocaceae, native to Southeast Asia. The specific epithet cerasifolia refers to the leaves' resemblance to those of a cherry tree.

Description
The smooth bark is brown or grey. The inflorescences bear 10, sometimes 15, white flowers.

Distribution and habitat
Symplocos cerasifolia is native to Southeast Asia: to Thailand, Peninsular Malaysia, Sumatra, Borneo and New Guinea.

References

cerasifolia
Flora of Borneo
Flora of New Guinea
Flora of Peninsular Malaysia
Flora of Sumatra
Flora of Thailand
Plants described in 1844